Granny Smith is a tip-bearing apple cultivar. 

Granny Smith may also refer to:

 Maria Ann Smith, credited with producing the Granny Smith apple
 Granny Smith Festival, an annual festival held in Eastwood, New South Wales
 Granny Smith Gold Mine, a gold mine in Western Australia
 Granny Smith (character), a character from the television series My Little Pony: Friendship Is Magic